Helen Caldwell (1904-1987) was a scholar and Brazilianist from California. Her work focuses on the 19th century Brazilian writer Machado de Assis.  She completed the first English translation of Dom Casmurro, published in 1953. Her most famous work is Machado de Assis: The Brazilian Master and His Novels (University of California, Los Angeles, 1970). She also translated 8 of the 12 stories in The Psychiatrist, and Other Stories (with William L. Grossman for the eponymous novella and three other stories) in 1973.

Works 
 .
 Machado de Assis: The Brazilian Master and His Novels

References

American women poets
Brazilianists
20th-century American poets
Writers from California
20th-century American women writers
1904 births
1987 deaths
20th-century American translators